Waverley Road was a station on the Outer Circle railway line, opened on 3 March 1890 as "Waverley" on the section between Burnley and Oakleigh stations, and was renamed on 23 June 1890. It became a junction on 30 May 1890 when the line from Camberwell opened, and was a Staff and Ticket station, being provided with a signal box of 28 levers. Two platforms were provided, with the junction of the two lines at the North (Camberwell) end, as was a goods siding located near the current East Malvern station in Malvern East, Victoria, Australia, in what is now the Malvern Urban Forest. The platform, the mound of which can still be seen, was located approximately 120 metres SSE of where the line crossed Waverley Road.

The signal box was replaced with a signal frame on the platform in 1891 to save staffing costs. The station was closed on 9 December 1895, along with the lines from Oakleigh to Ashburton station and Darling stations. On 3 February 1929 the line terminating at Darling was extended to East Malvern, and to Glen Waverley on 5 May 1930. In 1948 the line from Camberwell terminating at Ashburton was re-opened a kilometre southwards to the new Alamein station.

References

Footnotes 

Disused railway stations in Melbourne
Railway stations in Australia opened in 1890
Railway stations closed in 1895